Jessie Inchauspé (born 1992) is a French biochemist and author. She writes about the importance of balancing one's blood sugar for optimal health.

Biography 
Inchauspé was born in 1992. She holds a bachelor's degree in mathematics from King's College London, and a master's degree in biochemistry from Georgetown University.

An accident in which she broke her back at age 19 led her to be interested in health.

She worked at the genetics start-up 23andMe as product lead. In 2019, she started the @glucosegoddess Instagram account on which she shared graphs made from her own continuous glucose monitor data to illustrate nutritional science.

Published in April 2022, Glucose Revolution is Inchauspé's first book. Over 500,000 copies were sold worldwide in the five months following publication. It is a number 1 bestseller in France, the United Kingdom, Australia, Spain, and Germany. In the US, is a Wall Street Journal bestseller. It is translated into 30+ languages. In it, Inchauspé shares the importance of glucose regulation for all aspects of our health, and science-backed tips to manage it.

Inchauspé lives in New York City.

Works by Jessie Inchauspé
Glucose Revolution: The Life-Changing Power of Balancing Your Blood Sugar. New York: Simon & Schuster (2022). ISBN 1982179414

References

External links 
 Website

1992 births
Living people
French biochemists
French women biologists
French women chemists
21st-century French chemists
21st-century French non-fiction writers
French health and wellness writers
French women non-fiction writers
Alumni of King's College London
Georgetown University Graduate School of Arts and Sciences alumni
People with diabetes
Writers from New York City
French expatriates in the United States
Diet food writers